Pungi is a program for making spins of Fedora (Linux distribution), from the release 7 upwards. Pungi is mainly a distribution compose tool. Pungi consists of multiple separate executables backed by a common library.

Origin of name 
The name Pungi comes from the instrument used to charm snakes. Anaconda being the software Pungi was manipulating, and anaconda being a snake, led to the referential naming.

The first name, which was suggested by Seth Vidal, was FIST, Fedora Installation <Something> Tool. That name was quickly discarded and replaced with Pungi.

Reference

External links
Pungi page at Fedora project

Fedora Project
Free software